Stateira (370 BC - early 332 BC) was a queen of Persia as the wife of Darius III of Persia of the Achaemenid dynasty. 

She was possibly the sister of her husband.  She accompanied her husband while he went to war.  It was because of this that she was captured by Alexander the Great after the Battle of Issus, in 333 BC at the town of Issus. Her husband abandoned his entire family at the site as he fled from Alexander, including his mother Sisygambis and his daughters Stateira II and Drypetis. Alexander is reported to have treated them with great respect.

Stateira died giving birth to a son, Ochus in early 332 BC. She was given a splendid burial by Alexander, befitting her status as the wife of the Great King of Persia. Darius' mother Sisygambis had a lifelong respect and genuine friendship with Alexander.

In 324 BC, her daughter, Stateira, married Alexander, and her other daughter, Drypetis, married one of his lifetime companions, Hephaestion.  When Alexander died one year later these royal Persian women mourned his death, further indicating personal relationships rather than merely diplomatic ones. According to Plutarch, both of her daughters were assassinated by another wife of Alexander, Roxana and Perdiccas, one of Alexander's generals. Upon hearing the news of Alexander's death, Sisygambis said farewell to her family, turned to the wall, and fasted herself to death.

Historical novels and film
 Stateira is a minor character in The Conqueror's Wife by Stephanie Thornton, 2015, Softcover 
 In Oliver Stone's 2004 movie Alexander, Stateira is played by Annelise Hesme

References

External links
Pothos.org - Stateira, mother and daughter
Livius.org - Barsine/Statira

4th-century BC births
330s BC deaths
4th-century BC women
Deaths in childbirth
Women in Hellenistic warfare
Women in ancient Near Eastern warfare
Queens of the Achaemenid Empire
4th-century BC Iranian people
Darius III